Dąbrowska may refer to:

People
 Feminine variant of the surname Dąbrowski

Places
Kuźnica Dąbrowska, village in Namysłów County, Opole Voivodeship, in south-western Poland
Wólka Dąbrowska, village in Lipsko County, Masovian Voivodeship, in east-central Poland

See also
Dąbrusk
Dąbrówka (disambiguation)